Shamiran Khamis (born 13 February 1995) is an Australian soccer player, who currently plays for Western Sydney Wanderers. She has previously played for Sydney FC, Western Sydney Wanderers, Canberra United, and Melbourne Victory in the Australian W-League.

Club career
Khamis made her professional debut for Sydney FC during the 2011–12 W-League season. Sydney won the 2012–13 W-League Championship.

Khamis signed with the Western Sydney Wanderers for the 2014–15 season. After one season with the Wanderers, she returned to Sydney FC where she would remain for three seasons. Khamis signed with Canberra United for the 2018–19 W-League season. After initially moving to Canberra as a backup, she ended up playing every match after Melissa Maizels was injured during preseason.

In March 2020, she appeared on the bench for Melbourne Victory for one game.

She then joined Macarthur Rams.

In September 2021, Khamis returned to the W-League, joining Western Sydney Wanderers once more.

Personal
Khamis' older sister Leena, is also a professional football player in the W-League, she plays for the Western Sydney Wanderers. The sisters played together at Sydney FC for several seasons.

References

External links
 Sydney FC profile
S. Khamis at Soccerway

1995 births
Living people
Australian women's soccer players
Sydney FC (A-League Women) players
Western Sydney Wanderers FC (A-League Women) players
Canberra United FC players
Melbourne Victory FC (A-League Women) players
Australian people of Assyrian descent
Women's association football goalkeepers
Assyrian women's footballers